ORP Grom was a Project 30bis destroyer, sold to the People's Republic of Poland by the Soviet Union in 1957. She was built by the Zhdanov Shipyard in Leningrad and originally served in the Soviet Baltic Fleet as the Sposobnyy. She served together in the Polish Navy with her sister ship  until 1973. The ship was scrapped in 1977. Her remainings together with the Wicher were sunk in Hel as breakwaters, where they remain to this day.

References

Skoryy-class destroyers of the Polish Navy
Cold War destroyers of Poland
Ships built in the Soviet Union
Ships built in Saint Petersburg
Ships built at Severnaya Verf
1950 ships

Shipwrecks of Poland